Scott James Coyte (born 7 March 1985, in Liverpool, Sydney, Australia) is an Australian cricketer. He plays first-class cricket for New South Wales and has represented the Australian Under-19 team. He is a right-arm fast-medium bowler and a left-hand bat.

His sister, Sarah Coyte, has played for the Australian women's cricket team.

References

External links

New South Wales cricketers
Cricketers from Sydney
Living people
1985 births
Sydney Thunder cricketers